Joan Franka (born 2 April 1990 in Rotterdam) is a Dutch-Turkish singer with the birthname of Joany Franka Johanna Ayten Hazebroek Kalan. Her late father was Turkish, while her mother is Dutch. She represented the Netherlands at the Eurovision Song Contest 2012 with You and Me. She became well known in the Netherlands through her participation in the first series of The Voice of Holland, a talent show.

Music career

2010-2011: The Voice of Holland
In September 2010, Joan Franka entered the talent show, The Voice of Holland in its inaugural 2010–2011 season where she auditioned with Nickelback's "How You Remind Me". Two of four judges hit their "I Want You" buttons, judges Roel van Velzen and Jeroen van der Boom. She chose to be on van Velzen's team.

In the Battle round, she was put against Yvette de Bie. They both sang "One of Us" and she was kept to move to the live shows with de Bie being eliminated. In first live show, she sang Jewel's "Foolish Games" and in third live show Marc Cohn's "Walking in Memphis" and in fifth live show Beverley Craven's "Promise Me" when she was eliminated.

Two of the songs she sang during the competition charted as minor hits in the Dutch Singles Chart. "Foolish Games" reached #42 and "Promise Me" #45 based on downloads.

2012-present: Eurovision Song Contest
On 26 February 2012 Joan battled against her former fellow The Voice of Holland contestant Raffaëla Paton on the first round of Nationaal Songfestival 2012 and eventually advanced to the final round where she was eventually chosen to represent the Netherlands at the Eurovision Song Contest 2012, held in Baku, Azerbaijan. Despite coming last with the jury vote of 11 she led the televotes with 26.1 points which resulted in her victory. Her song entry for the contest, "You and Me", was released in the Netherlands on 27 February 2012 as a Music download and also on a limited CD-single.

Franka performed at the second semi-final in the 2012 Eurovision Song Contest and failed to reach the final, making it the 8th straight year the Netherlands had failed to make the Eurovision final.

Discography

Singles

References

External links

1990 births
Living people
Dutch people of Turkish descent
Eurovision Song Contest entrants for the Netherlands
Eurovision Song Contest entrants of 2012
Musicians from Rotterdam
The Voice (franchise) contestants
21st-century Dutch singers
21st-century Dutch women singers
Nationaal Songfestival contestants